David Reivers (born 21 November 1958) is a Jamaican–American actor and the father of fellow actor Corbin Bleu. He is best known for co-starring as his real-life son's father in the Disney Channel Original Movie Jump In! and High School Musical 3: Senior Year, and in Free Style. He also had a recurring role as Bob Cowan in the supernatural television series Charmed (2001–02).

Filmography

External links

1958 births
Living people
Jamaican male actors